Caucasalia is a genus of flowering plants in the daisy family.

Species
There are four species in the genus.
 Caucasalia macrophylla - Turkey, Caucasus
 Caucasalia parviflora - Azerbaijan, Republic of Georgia
 Caucasalia pontica - Republic of Georgia
 Caucasalia similiflora - Republic of Georgia

References

Senecioneae
Asteraceae genera